Park Jin-young (born 14 April 1997) is a South Korean swimmer. She competed in the women's 200 metre butterfly event at the 2016 Summer Olympics. In 2014, she represented South Korea at the 2014 Summer Youth Olympics held in Nanjing, China.

References

External links
 

1997 births
Living people
South Korean female butterfly swimmers
Olympic swimmers of South Korea
Swimmers at the 2016 Summer Olympics
Swimmers at the 2014 Summer Youth Olympics
21st-century South Korean women